Baba  is a village in the administrative district of Gmina Skrwilno, within Rypin County, Kuyavian-Pomeranian Voivodeship, in north-central Poland.

References

Baba